Jakobselva is a river in Troms og Finnmark county, Norway. The river, which is sometimes known as the Vestre Jakobselv (Western Jacob's River), runs through the municipalities of Nesseby and Vadsø on the Varanger Peninsula. The river begins around the mountain Midthaugen in Nesseby, near the border with Tana Municipality. It then winds its way down through a lush birch wood valley along the municipal border between Nesseby and Vadsø to the village of Vestre Jakobselv where it completes its  journey and empties into the Varangerfjorden.

The river is known as a superb sport fishing river, with a lot of big salmon.

References

Rivers of Troms og Finnmark
Vadsø
Nesseby
Rivers of Norway